Treasure Valley Mathematics and Science Center, often referred to as Treasure Valley Math and Science Center or TVMSC, is a public magnet school in Boise, Idaho operated by the Boise School District that offers advanced secondary mathematics, science, technology, and research classes to students living in the Treasure Valley. After being accepted into the program, students attend TVMSC in its morning or afternoon sessions while they attend their normal public or non-public elementary, junior high, high schools, or are home-schooled, during the other part of the day.  Since the school's founding in 2004, the program has been led by Dr. Holly Maclean, who, as the school principal, carefully leads the school's twelve teachers who have extensive experience in the subjects they teach.

Although the classes TVMSC offers are usually taught as advanced courses in grades seven through twelve, students at any age can apply for the school, as the program accepts students based on teacher recommendations that determine a student's desire to excel in math and science, report cards to determine academic capability, standardized test scores to determine knowledge, and fulfillment of prerequisite math classes, which can be taken as summer classes before entering the program. TVMSC was founded in 2004 with a donation of $1,000,000 from Micron Technology, whose headquarters are in Boise, as well as $300,000 worth of equipment from Hewlett-Packard, which has a large campus in Boise as well. Since cuts in funding caused by the 2008–2012 global recession inhibited the original plans for its own permanent location on the Boise State Campus, TVMSC holds its classes in the upper floor of the south wing at Riverglen Junior High School.

TVMSC has two very successful teams that compete in the National Science Bowl and the National Middle School Science Bowl. The middle school team placed 4th in the academic competition and 2nd in the electric car competition in 2014, 2013, and 2012, as well as placing 1st in the 2008 fuel cell car overall and 2nd fuel cell car race.

As of the 2018–19 school year, the TVMSC mascot is the Sloth, selected by a student vote. The following year, the students voted to name the mascot Slothy Joe.

References 

Educational institutions established in 2004
Magnet schools in Idaho
High schools in Boise, Idaho
2004 establishments in Idaho